The Australian Department of Finance and Deregulation was a Federal Government department that existed between December 2007 and September 2013. Its role was to help the Australian Government achieve its policy objectives by contributing to four key outcomes:

 sustainable Government finances;
 more efficient Government operations;
 efficiently functioning Parliament; and
 effective and efficient use of information and communication technology by the Australian Government.

Statement of Purpose
The purpose of the Department of Finance and Deregulation was stated as:

Operations
The matters dealt with by the Department included:
 Budget policy advice and process
 Government financial accountability
 Shareholder advice on Government Business Enterprises
 Superannuation of former and current members of parliament and Australian Government employees
 Government asset sales
 Management of non-Defence Government-owned property
 Electoral matters (through the Australian Electoral Commission)
 Administration of Parliamentarians' entitlements
 Administration of the Australian Government's self-managed general insurance fund
 Government online delivery and information technology and communications management (through the Australian Government Information Management Office)
 Advice on the Australian Government Future Fund
 Management of government records (through the National Archives of Australia)
 Central advertising system

References

Finance and Deregulation
Ministries established in 2007
2013 disestablishments in Australia